Delgerkhangai (Wide/expansive; khangai, provident lord, munificent king, generous gracious lord or bountiful king) is a sum (district) of Dundgovi Province in central Mongolia. In 2007, its population was 2,530. Inscription of Yanran, an important historical relic, is located here.

References 

Districts of Dundgovi Province